, also nicknamed  is a fictional character from the anime Tiger & Bunny. He is a young man named Barnaby Brooks, Jr. who has the same power as the other lead, Kotetsu T. Kaburagi. However, Barnaby and Kotetsu have trouble working together, as they have conflicting opinions on how a superhero should act, while at the same time they are trying to crack the mystery of the murder of Barnaby's parents. In addition, the appearance of a homicidal vigilante NEXT named "Lunatic" stirs up the public and makes them question the place of heroes in the city. The two develop their relationship across television series and films.

Barnaby was created by Masafumi Nishida, who wanted the character to start as an antisocial character. This was meant to be a contrast to the easygoing Kotetsu; When they team up in the first half, Barnaby opens up to the rest of the cast. He is voiced by Masakazu Morita in Japanese and Yuri Lowenthal in English. Barnaby Brooks Jr.'s characterization earned both positive and mixed responses due to his darker personality, which contrasts Kotetsu's more likable side. However, the character's growth in the television series and his notable bond with Kotetsu earned high praise.

Creation
While Kotetsu and Barnaby bond for the series' entire run, there was an agreement to focus on a build up during the first half. Kotetsu and Barnaby are respectively voiced by Hiroaki Hirata and Masakazu Morita in Japanese. Their recording mics were always next to each other, and, unlike Hirata, Morita found Kotetsu as a helpful character to play along. Morita felt that Barnaby was too antisocial until the fifth episode, where he felt his character was, for the first time, having real interactions, to which Hirata said that Morita was struggling in early episodes. During the series' second half, Barnaby developed his character, which made him more pleasant to voice. Hirata felt that Barnaby was the same, claiming that his personality was that of the tsundere archetype who is awkward at displaying his emotions.

Since his first episode, Barnaby is so focused on avenging his parents that he ends up hiding himself, and never shows his true colors to anyone. Barnaby puts enormous pressure on himself, pinning him down, but by the 13th episode, he has become closer to Kotetsu. Nishida attempted to show it as realistically as he could. The development of the main duo was originally left up to the audience's expectation until Nishida wrote the movie The Rising, where there would be more pressure regarding an official break up. He wanted to add some twists and turns that had not been shown in the main series yet. Kotetsu's powers are declining, and he might have to change his life soon, so the breakup of his partnership with Barnaby seemed inevitable. The situation and his relationships have changed compared to the first episode, but the plot development is quite similar.

Appearances
The other protagonist is known as the "Super Rookie", who is nicknamed "Bunny" by Kotetsu because of his armor's earpieces and his penchant for long jumps and kicks. Barnaby is a 25-year-old rookie hero who does not conceal his appearance or identity and is the newest addition to Hero TV. Partnered with Wild Tiger, he has the same power, though Barnaby relies more on strategy than outright brute force, saving his Hundred Power for the most dire of circumstances. His powered suit displays advertising for Amazon.co.jp as well as Bandai and its "Crusade System" Card Series. He is also equipped with a motorcycle called the "Lonely Chaser" that is able to use Tiger's own bike as a sidecar, a combination known as "Double Chaser." When he was four years old, his parents, robotics engineers and the inventors of "nano-metal", were assassinated by someone originally thought to be Jake Martinez of the crime syndicate "Ouroboros". Barnaby was taken in by Albert Maverick and dedicated his life to investigating Ouroboros and its connection with the death of his family. The trauma of seeing his parents murdered hardened Barnaby's heart and consumed him with thoughts of revenge, making it impossible for him to trust anyone until he began his partnership with Kotetsu. According to Barnaby, he took his real name, also his father's, as his hero name as a declaration of war against Ouroboros. After defeating Albert Maverick, Barnaby retires from heroics, thinking his entire career was for nothing, but when Kotetsu returns as "Wild Tiger 1 Minute" a year later, Barnaby decides to return in order to assist his partner.

After defeating Jake Martinez and learning to trust Kotetsu as his partner, Barnaby adopts a positive outlook on life, becoming more open and willing to work with others. He starts addressing Kotetsu by name instead of as "Old Man", and accepts "Bunny" as his nickname. Though when his memory is altered by Maverick, Barnaby is snap out of the mental conditioning when he's called Bunny. His successful partnership with Kotetsu soon leads Barnaby to rank first in Hero TV's rankings, earning him the "King of Heroes" title in his debut season. Barnaby eventually surpasses Mr. Legend's points-per-season record, and dreams of a "Hero World" envisioned by his surrogate father, Albert Maverick, where all NEXT are accepted and heroes protect the innocent.

In Tiger & Bunny: The Rising, Barnaby finds himself with a new partner, Golden Ryan, to replace him as he views Wild Tiger as past his prime. Kotetsu doesn't fight this decision, as he doesn't want to hold Barnaby back from returning to the First League. On their first mission together, Ryan & Barnaby successfully keep a toppling tower from falling, but Ryan's use of his gravity powers kept the other heroes from helping at all.

Reception

Barnaby has been a popular character in Japan, taking the second place in an AniGlobe poll, behind Kotetsu. In a promo of a Tiger & Bunny: The Beginning poll he once again took the same spot and fourth in a Yomerumo poll.

ComicsAlliance's described Barnaby's backstory the as Bronze Age—but also "reality TV and celebrity culture". Allen Moody of THEM Anime Reviews found Barnaby more of the main focus of the story than Kotetsu due to how his quest for vengeance leads him to find several of the series' antagonists whose multiple twists are novel even if they are used several times in the media. Anime Network's Seb Reid described the shows as well-written and a "pleasure to watch", and similarly to Orsini, also reacted positively to its lighthearted tone, showing that superheroes don't need to "be dark and husky-voiced". Seid took note that the series improved as it progressed and revealed more about Barnaby's backstory and the mystery regarding his parents' death. Barnaby was often seen as the least likable character as result of his antisocial personality which is why ComicsAlliance recommended fans to read the manga which is seen from his own point of view and helps understand him more. Anime News Network praised how Barnaby's nickname that he hates is the solution to him restoring his original memories in the television series when being brainwashed by the enemy and also the code number that he was obsessed was his dead parents' last message towards him. IndieWire felt that while it was obvious that the duo wins their final fight, the directing done in the series make them interesting to watch.

Syfy's Michelle Villanueva also commended the characters' relationship, stating that the show "excels with the Buddy Cop trope" and enjoyed the Kotetsu and Barnaby growing from reluctant teammates to best friends, as well as their banter. Charles Solomon of IndieWire noted that while the concept of a "mismatched duo" is not original, it is "infinitely recycable", something which Tiger & Bunny showcases through their relationship. Beveridge also praised their relationship, finding it appropriately comedic, opinionating that both characters being adults enhances their relationship and the show, making it a "treat to watch". The handling of both characters in the manga adaptation and the first movie was praised by ComicBookBin as well as the closer focus on Barnaby's past.

Regarding Barnaby's role in the movie, Rice Digital enjoyed the handling of the duo as they initially break up but return to be a duo once again in the ending. IndieWire praised how despite taking place after the television series, the interactions between Kotetsu and Barnaby are appealing, finding them comical. Kotaku found Barnaby's story different from Kotetsu's as he deals with another villain but lamented such role unmemorable while CGI was poor at depicting him interacting with Kotetsu in their suits. Anime News Network compared the two heroes similar to lovers due to how both are unable to separate after both the television series and the films, making the plot's story repetitive. Yuri Lowenthal's performance as Kotetsu's English voice was praised by Anime Herald and IndieWire. Comic Book Resources felt that Barnaby's character arc involving his revenge was not fully closed in the series and hoped the sequel would focus on this.

References

Anime and manga characters with superhuman strength
Japanese superheroes
Male characters in anime and manga
Male superheroes
Superheroes in anime and manga
Television characters introduced in 2011